Abdullah Eisa (Arabic:عبد الله عيسى) (born 1 January 1987) is an Emirati footballer.

External links

References

Emirati footballers
1987 births
Living people
Al Shabab Al Arabi Club Dubai players
Al-Shaab CSC players
Place of birth missing (living people)
UAE First Division League players
UAE Pro League players
Association football forwards